Floyd O. Temple (February 3, 1926 – June 29, 2012) was the head coach of the University of Kansas baseball team from 1954 to 1981. He also managed and played in the minor leagues in the early 1950s.

A third baseman, Temple was born in Coffeyville, Kansas, and began his professional career in 1950, playing for the Gladewater Bears of the East Texas League, hitting .167 in 15 games. He played for the Iola Indians of the Kansas–Oklahoma–Missouri League in 1951 and 1952, hitting .292 and .295 respectively. Overall, he hit .278 in 110 minor league games. He also managed the Indians for parts of the 1951 and 1952 seasons.

Following his professional career, he became the head coach of the University of Kansas baseball team. He compiled a record of 437–396–7 in his 28 seasons with the team, becoming its winningest head coach ever. His #13 jersey was placated on the right-center field wall at Hoglund Ballpark.

In 1965, Temple managed the Rapid City Chiefs of the Basin League, a collegiate summer baseball league.

He coached multiple future major league players, including Steve Renko, Bob Allison and Chuck Dobson.

He was inducted into the Kansas Baseball Hall of Fame in 1966.  He died, aged 86, in Lawrence, Kansas.

Head coaching record

References

Kansas Jayhawks baseball coaches
Minor league baseball players
University of Kansas alumni
1926 births
2012 deaths
People from Coffeyville, Kansas